Tarik Khbabez (born 20 April 1992) is a Moroccan-Dutch kickboxer currently signed to Glory, where he competes in the heavyweight division. He formerly competed SUPERKOMBAT Fighting Championship, having won the SUPERKOMBAT World Grand Prix Heavyweight Tournament in 2015. Khbabez has also competed in ONE Championship is a former ONE Light Heavyweight Kickboxing world title challenger. In 2021, he was the runner up for the Glory 77: Rotterdam Heavyweight Tournament.

He is ranked as the ninth best heavyweight by Combat Press as of September 2022, and sixth best by Beyond Kick as of October 2022.

Career

SUPERKOMBAT
Khbabez took part in the 2014 SUPERKOMBAT Qualification tournament. In the semifinals he beat Gurhan Degirmenci through a first round TKO. He defeated Dexter Suisse in the finals by unanimous decision.

He participated in the 2015 SUPERKOMBAT World Grand Prix. In the semifinals he defeated Nicolas Wamba by decision. Tarik won the final bout against Roman Kryklia by decision as well.

ONE Championship
Tarik Khbabez made his ONE Championship debut on June 23, 2018 at ONE Championship: Pinnacle of Power, where he defeated Alain Ngalani by TKO at 1:43 of the third round.

On August 27, 2018, Khbabez signed a multi-fight contract with ONE Championship, where he would compete in the organization's all-striking ONE Super Series.

On October 26, 2018, he faced Ibrahim El Bouni at ONE Championship: Pursuit of Greatness. Khbabez won the fight by TKO via referee stoppage. On March 9, 2019, he picked up a unanimous decision victory over Andrei Stoica at ONE Championship: Reign of Valor. On June 15, 2019, he defeated Anderson Silva by unanimous decision at ONE Championship: Legendary Quest. At this point, Khbabez was 4–0 in ONE Super Series.

On November 16, 2019, Tarik Khbabez faced Roman Kryklia for the inaugural ONE Light Heavyweight Kickboxing World Championship. Going into the fight as a favorite, Khbabez lost by TKO in the second round.

Glory
On October 30, 2020, it was announced that Tarik Khbabez signed with Glory. Khbabez will make his promotional debut at Glory 77, against Antonio Plazibat. Khbabez was later rescheduled to face Levi Rigters in a four man heavyweight tournament. He beat Rigters by split decision, but lost the final bout against Rico Verhoeven by TKO. Three months prior to the tournament, Khbabez underwent hand surgery. He later revealed he had re-injured his hand during the final bout with Verhoeven.

Khbabez was scheduled to fight the #6 ranked Glory heavyweight Antonio Plazibat at Glory 78: Arnhem. The pair was originally scheduled to fight at GLORY 77, before Plazibat withdrew due to injuries sustained in training.

Khbabaez was booked to face the Glory Light Heavyweight champion Artem Vakhitov in a catchweight non-title bout at Glory 80 on March 19, 2022. Vakhitov withdrew from the bout on March 12.

Khbabez fought a rematch with Antonio Plazibat at Glory 80 Studio on May 14, 2022. He lost the fight by a third-round knockout.

Khbabez faced Sergej Maslobojev for the vacant Glory Light Heavyweight Championship at Glory: Collision 4 on October 8, 2022. He lost the fight by split decision.

Khbabez was expected to face Kristpas Zile at Glory 84 on March 11, 2023. Zile later withdrew from the bout and was replaced by Daniel Toledo. Khbabez won the fight by a second-round technical knockout.

Titles and accomplishments
 Glory
 2021 Glory 77 Heavyweight Tournament Runner-Up 

 SUPERKOMBAT Fighting Championship
 2015 SUPERKOMBAT World Grand Prix Winner
 2014 SUPERKOMBAT World Grand Prix IV Tournament Champion

Professional kickboxing record

|-  style="background:#cfc;"
| 2023-03-11 || Win ||align=left| Daniel Toledo || Glory 84 || Rotterdam, Netherlands || TKO (Corner stoppage) || 2 ||2:47 
|-

|-  style="background:#fbb;"
| 2022-10-08 || Loss ||align=left| Sergej Maslobojev || Glory: Collision 4 || Arnhem, Netherlands || Decision (Split) || 5 || 3:00
|-
! style=background:white colspan=9 |
|- 
|-   bgcolor="#fbb"
| 2022-05-14 || Loss ||align=left| Antonio Plazibat || Glory 80 Studio || Netherlands || KO (Punches) || 3 || 0:52
|-
|-   bgcolor="#fbb"
| 2021-09-04 || Loss || align="left" | Antonio Plazibat || Glory 78: Arnhem || Arnhem, Netherlands || KO (Punches) || 2 ||  2:14
|-   bgcolor="#fbb"
| 2021-01-30 || Loss ||align=left| Rico Verhoeven || Glory 77: Rotterdam, Final || Rotterdam, Netherlands || TKO (Corner Stoppage/Injury) || 1 || 3:00
|-
! style=background:white colspan=9 |
|-   bgcolor="#CCFFCC"
| 2021-01-30 || Win ||align=left| Levi Rigters || Glory 77: Rotterdam, Semi Final || Rotterdam, Netherlands || Decision (Majority) || 3 || 3:00
|-
|-  bgcolor="#FFBBBB"
| 2019-11-16 || Loss ||align=left| Roman Kryklia || ONE Championship: Age Of Dragons || Beijing, China || TKO (3 Knockdown Rule) || 2 || 0:43 
|-
! style=background:white colspan=9 |
|-  bgcolor="#CCFFCC"
| 2019-06-15 || Win ||align=left| Anderson Silva || ONE Championship: Legendary Quest || Shanghai, China || Decision (Unanimous) || 3 || 3:00
|-  bgcolor="#CCFFCC"
| 2019-03-09 || Win ||align=left| Andrei Stoica || ONE Championship: Reign of Valor || Yangon, Myanmar || Decision (Unanimous) || 3 || 3:00
|-  bgcolor="#CCFFCC"
| 2018-10-26 || Win ||align=left| Ibrahim El Bouni  || ONE Championship: Pursuit of Greatness || Yangon, Myanmar || TKO (Referee Stoppage)  || 3 || 2:26
|-  bgcolor="#CCFFCC"
| 2018-06-23 || Win ||align=left| Alain Ngalani || |ONE Championship: Pinnacle of Power || Beijing, China || TKO || 3 || 1:49
|-  bgcolor="#CCFFCC"
| 2017-10-29 || Win ||align=left| Nordine Mahieddine || World Fighting League || Almere, Netherlands || Decision || 3 || 3:00
|-  bgcolor="#CCFFCC"
| 2017-04-23 || Win ||align=left| Gokhan Gedik || World Fighting League 5 : Champions vs. Champions || Almere, Netherlands || Decision || 3 || 3:00
|-  bgcolor="#FFBBBB"
| 2016-12-03 || Loss ||align=left| Murat Aygun || Mix Fight Gala 20 || Frankfurt, Germany || Ext R. Decision || 4 || 3:00
|-  bgcolor="#CCFFCC"
| 2016-09-24 || Win ||align=left| Bilal Abu Ali || Mix Fight Gala || Istanbul, Turkey || TKO || 2 || 2:05
|-  bgcolor="#FFBBBB"
| 2016-06-18 || Loss ||align=left| Martin Pacas || W5 EUROPEAN LEAGUE XXXV || Prievidza, Slovakia || TKO || 2 || 0:30
|-  bgcolor="#FFBBBB"
| 2016-02-16 || Loss ||align=left| Kirill Kornilov || ACB KB 5: Let's Knock The Winter Out || Orel, Russia || TKO || 2 || 1:35
|-  bgcolor="#CCFFCC"
| 2015-11-07 || Win ||align=left| Roman Kryklia || SUPERKOMBAT World Grand Prix Final 2015, Final || Bucharest, Romania || Decision || 3 || 3:00
|-
! style=background:white colspan=9 |
|-  bgcolor="#CCFFCC"
| 2015-11-07 || Win ||align=left| Nicolas Wamba || SUPERKOMBAT World Grand Prix Final 2015, Semi Finals || Bucharest, Romania || Decision || 3 || 3:00
|-  bgcolor="#CCFFCC"
| 2015-10-16 || Win ||align=left| Sebastian Ciobanu || ACB KB 3: Grand Prix Final || Sibiu, Romania || Decision || 3 || 3:00
|-  bgcolor="#CCFFCC"
| 2015-04-29 || Win ||align=left| Sasha Polugic || Tatneft Cup 2015 - 1st Selection || Kazan, Russia || TKO || 2 ||
|-  bgcolor="#FFBBBB"
| 2015-04-12 || Loss||align=left| Brian Douwes || World Fighting League || Hoofddorp, Netherlands || Decision|| 3 || 3:00
|-  bgcolor="#CCFFCC"
| 2014-09-27 || Win ||align=left| Dexter Suisse || SUPERKOMBAT World Grand Prix IV, Qualification Tournament, Final || Almere, Netherlands || Decision || 3 || 3:00
|- 
! style=background:white colspan=9 |
|-  bgcolor="#CCFFCC"
| 2014-09-27 || Win ||align=left| Gurhan Degirmenci || SUPERKOMBAT World Grand Prix IV, Qualification Tournament, Semi Finals || Almere, Netherlands || TKO || 1 || 3:00
|-  bgcolor="#c5d2ea"
| 2013-06-01 || Draw ||align=left| Ismael Lazaar || Fight Fans - Kickboxer V || Amsterdam, Netherlands || Decision || 3 || 3:00
|-
| colspan=9 | Legend:

See also
 List of male kickboxers

References

Living people
1992 births
Dutch male kickboxers
Moroccan male kickboxers
Light heavyweight kickboxers
Moroccan emigrants to the Netherlands
Sportspeople from Rabat
Glory kickboxers
SUPERKOMBAT kickboxers
ONE Championship kickboxers